Evansville Journal News, also known as the Citizens Bank Building-Evansville Journal Building, is a historic commercial building located in downtown Evansville, Indiana. It was built in 1910, and is a two-story, Beaux-Arts style brick building with a limestone front.  The building was originally built to house a newspaper.

It was listed on the National Register of Historic Places in 1982.

References

Commercial buildings on the National Register of Historic Places in Indiana
Beaux-Arts architecture in Indiana
Commercial buildings completed in 1910
Buildings and structures in Evansville, Indiana
National Register of Historic Places in Evansville, Indiana